Neues aus Uhlenbusch is a German television series for children related to the living in the fictive farming village Uhlenbusch.

Between 1977 and 1982, a total of 40 episodes were produced by the public broadcasting corporation ZDF. Also a movie was produced in 1980 incorporating three episodes put into one framework.

See also
List of German television series

External links
 

German children's television series
1977 German television series debuts
1982 German television series endings
German-language television shows
ZDF original programming